The Bloody Christmas (Kărvava Koleda; , Krvava Koleda) or the Bloody Bozhik (Karvav Bozhik; , Krvav Božiḱ) was a campaign in which several hundred people of Macedonian Bulgarian descent were killed as collaborationists by the Yugoslav communist authorities in the Socialist Republic of Macedonia from 7 to 9 January 1945. Thousands of others who retained their pro-Bulgarian sympathies and pro-Bulgarian views, suffered severe repression as a result.

After the end of the Second World War, Bulgarians in the so-called "new lands" in Vardar Macedonia, briefly annexed to Bulgaria during the war, were persecuted using charges of "great-Bulgarian chauvinism". This chapter of Macedonian history was a taboo subject for conversation until the late 1980s, and, as a result, decades of official silence created a reaction in the form of numerous data manipulations for nationalist and communist propaganda purposes. To wipe out the Bulgarophile sentiments of parts of the local population, the Yugoslav communists started a process of nation-building.

From the start of the new Socialist Republic of Macedonia, accusations surfaced that new authorities were involved in retribution against people who did not support the formation of the new ethnic Macedonian identity. The number of dead "traitors" and "collaborators" due to organized killings of Bulgarians during Bloody Christmas and afterwards is unclear, but some sources put the number of victims at 1,200. The idea was to weaken the Bulgarian intelligentsia in Macedonia, to eradicate Bulgarian self-consciousness of parts of the population, and to speed-up the process of Macedonisation. At the end of 1944, a law was passed for the protection of the Macedonian national honour, which legalized the persecution of people who openly expressed Bulgarian self-consciousness. Special courts were also set up to protect Macedonia's national honour.

During the terror of January 1945, on the road between Lake Ohrid and Lake Prespa, and on the hills of Galičica mountain near the village of Oteševo and other villages, more Bulgarians were executed. Most of the bodies were disposed of in Lake Prespa. Nearly all inhabited places in Vardar Macedonia provided victims for the campaign. In several cities in Vardar Macedonia which were set up people's courts, issuing death sentences over citizens charged of "great-Bulgarian chauvinism".  In Skopje. in 1945 alone, 18 trials were held with 226 defendants, 22 of whom were sentenced to death. In Štip in the same period, seven Bulgarians were sentenced to death. Ten Bulgarians were sentenced to death in Prilep and in Veles. In Bitola, nine were sentenced to death.

According to Bulgarian sources, between 1945 and 1947 over 4,700 Bulgarians were massacred or went missing. As a result of the purge, up to 100,000 people were deported, displaced, imprisoned, persecuted or sent to concentration camps in Yugoslavia.

See also
 Law for the Protection of Macedonian National Honour
 Macedonian nationalism
 Macedonian Bulgarians
 Bulgarians in North Macedonia
  Gotse Delchev Brigade

References
Informational notes

Citations

External links
 Statistics of Yugoslavia's Democide. Estimates, calculations, and sources by R.J. Rummel.

Yugoslav Macedonia
Internal Macedonian Revolutionary Organization
1945 in Bulgaria
1945 in the Socialist Republic of Macedonia
Macedonian Bulgarians
Yugoslav Macedonia in World War II
Anti-Bulgarian sentiment
Political repression in Communist Yugoslavia
Political and cultural purges
Bulgaria–Yugoslavia relations
January 1945 events in Europe
Ethnic cleansing in Europe
Aftermath of World War II in Yugoslavia
Conflicts in 1945
Mass murder in 1945